FCIAC, the Fairfield County Interscholastic Athletic Conference, was established in 1961 and is made up of high schools throughout Fairfield County, Connecticut, United States. FCIAC hosts more than 100 combined championship/tournament games for all sports throughout the academic year. The conference comprises 17 schools.

Member Schools

East Division

Central Division

West Division

Lacrosse
Coaches Guy Whitten (Wilton) and Howard Benedict (New Canaan) are believed to be the "Founding Fathers of Connecticut Lacrosse."  In 2008 in Inside Lacrosse Magazine, Bates Head Lacrosse Coach, Peter Lasagna stated "Guy Whitten (Wilton) and Howard Benedict (New Canaan) created cultures of excellence to be envied."

References

External links 
 FCIAC Home Page
 Connecticut Post high school sports page
 FCIAC Football Blog

Sports in Connecticut
High school sports conferences and leagues in the United States
Education in Fairfield County, Connecticut